Rishi coffins are funerary coffins adorned with a feather design, which were used in Ancient Egypt. They are typical of the Egyptian Second Intermediate Period, circa 1650 to 1550 BC. The name comes from ريشة (risha), Arabic for "feather". 

During the Egyptian Old Kingdom and Middle Kingdom, coffins were rectangular. The first coffins in anthropoid (human) shape only appear in the 12th Dynasty. These designs copied  mummies showing a human head and the body without arms and legs as if they are wrapped in linen. The coffins were always in several sets with the outer coffin being rectangular. Perhaps already in the 13th Dynasty, these anthropoid coffins were decorated all over with a feather design and are no longer placed within an outer, rectangular coffin. These are the first rishi coffins. The earliest example mentioned in literature is the coffin of the scribe of the great enclosure Neferhotep, dating to the 13th Dynasty. However, this coffin was only described by the excavator and is now lost. The earliest secure known examples of rishi coffins belong to the kings of the 17th Dynasty, and were found in the 19th century at Thebes (Luxor). The depicted person most often wears a nemes headdress, the body is covered with feathers, there is an inscription in the middle going from the top to the bottom and on the chest are shown a vulture and a cobra, both royal symbols.

From the 17th Dynasty are also known many private rishi coffins. This type of coffin is still attested in the early New Kingdom, but is later replaced by other coffin types.

Literature 
 Gianluca Miniaci: Rishi Coffins and the Funerary Culture of Second Intermediate Period Egypt, London 2011,

References 

Egyptian artefact types
Coffins